Li Yapeng (born September 27, 1971) is a Chinese actor. He starred in two CCTV television adaptations of Louis Cha's wuxia novels, playing Linghu Chong in the 2000 series, Laughing in the Wind, and Guo Jing in the 2003 series The Legend of the Condor Heroes. In 2010 Yapeng announced his retirement from acting.

Early life
On September 27, 1971, Li Yapeng was born in Shuimogou District, Ürümqi, Xinjiang. His family members include his father, mother and his two-year-older brother. 

He went to Bayi Senior High School of Ürümqi. 

From 1983 to 1986, he became a monitor in the junior high school and youth corps committee secretary. 

In July 1986, he failed the junior school to high school test when he was 15 years old, so he packed up the bags from Xinjiang to his aunt's home in Hefei, Anhui, and went to the eighth middle school in Hefei. 

He entered the Central Academy of Drama. 

At the end of July 1990, he finished his university entrance exam.

In September 1990, he studied in the Central Academy of Drama. After a week, he went to Tianjin to contact the transfer matters, but failed and was dumped by his girlfriend.

Investment business
In 2002, Li Yapeng did not work with The Tang Dynasty after the expiration of contract, his investment fields involved in film and television production, travel, publishing, catering, IT industry, real estate, etc. In May 2011, Li Yapeng make through the formal interview and went into the Cheung Kong Graduate School of Business for EMBA courses.

Marriage
In 2005 he married singer actress Faye Wong. In May 2006, they had a daughter named Li Yan or Lyla (李嫣). Li Yan was born with a cleft lip, and in November 2006 the couple established a charity, the Smile Angel Foundation, to give assistance to other children with the condition.

Li and Faye Wong later divorced on September 13, 2013.

Retirement
On November 27, 2010 in the 2010 Stars Ceremony held in Himalayan hotel, Li Yapeng announced in an interview that the Eternal Moment would be his last film.

Filmography
The Singer (1997)
Laughing in the Wind (2001)
Beach (2003)
The Legend of the Condor Heroes (2003)
The Royal Swordsmen (2005)
Eternal Moment (2011)

References

External links
 
Smileangel Foundation 

1971 births
Chinese male television actors
Chinese male film actors
Male actors from Xinjiang
Faye Wong
Living people
People's Republic of China Buddhists
20th-century Chinese male actors
21st-century Chinese male actors
People from Ürümqi
Central Academy of Drama alumni